Ida Da Poian (born 5 May 1946) is an Italian former archer.

Career 

Da Poian won a bronze medal at the 1974 World Field Archery Championships and a gold medal at the European Archery Championships the same year.

She competed at the 1976 Summer Olympic Games in the women's individual event and finished nineteenth with a score of 2282 points.

References

External links 

 Profile on worldarchery.org

1946 births
Living people
Italian female archers
Olympic archers of Italy
Archers at the 1976 Summer Olympics